In algebraic geometry,  a Fano variety, introduced by Gino Fano in , is a complete variety X whose anticanonical bundle KX* is ample. In this definition, one could assume that X is smooth over a field, but the minimal model program has also led to the study of Fano varieties with various types of singularities, such as terminal or klt singularities. Recently techniques in differential geometry have been applied to the study of Fano varieties over the complex numbers, and success has been found in constructing moduli spaces of Fano varieties and proving the existence of Kähler–Einstein metrics on them through the study of K-stability of Fano varieties.

Examples
 The fundamental example of Fano varieties are the projective spaces: the anticanonical line bundle of Pn over a field k is O(n+1), which is very ample (over the complex numbers, its curvature is n+1 times the Fubini–Study symplectic form).
 Let D be a smooth codimension-1 subvariety in Pn. The adjunction formula implies that KD = (KX + D)|D = (−(n+1)H + deg(D)H)|D, where H is the class of a hyperplane. The hypersurface D is therefore Fano if and only if deg(D) < n+1.
 More generally, a smooth complete intersection of hypersurfaces in n-dimensional projective space is Fano if and only if the sum of their degrees is at most n.
 Weighted projective space P(a0,...,an) is a singular (klt) Fano variety. This is the projective scheme associated to a graded polynomial ring whose generators have degrees a0,...,an. If this is well formed, in the sense that no n of the numbers a have a common factor greater than 1, then any complete intersection of hypersurfaces such that the sum of their degrees is less than a0+...+an is a Fano variety.
 Every projective variety in characteristic zero that is homogeneous under a linear algebraic group is Fano.

Some properties

The existence of some ample line bundle on X is equivalent to X being a projective variety, so a Fano variety is always projective. In particular, the Todd genus  automatically equals 1. The  cases of this vanishing statement also tell us that the first Chern class induces an isomorphism .

By Yau's solution of the Calabi conjecture, a smooth complex variety admits Kähler metrics of positive
Ricci curvature if and only if it is Fano. Myers' theorem  therefore tells us that the universal cover  of a Fano manifold is compact, and so can only be a finite covering. However,  we have just seen that the Todd genus of a Fano manifold must equal 1. Since this would also apply to the manifold's universal cover, and since the Todd genus is multiplicative under finite covers, it follows that any Fano manifold is simply connected.

A much easier fact is that every Fano variety has Kodaira dimension −∞.

Campana and Kollár–Miyaoka–Mori showed that a smooth Fano variety over an algebraically closed field is rationally chain connected; that is, any two closed points can be connected by a chain of rational curves.
Kollár–Miyaoka–Mori also showed that the smooth Fano varieties of a given dimension over an algebraically closed field of characteristic zero form a bounded family, meaning that they are classified by the points of finitely many algebraic varieties. In particular, there are only finitely many deformation classes of Fano varieties of each dimension. In this sense, Fano varieties are much more special than other classes of varieties such as varieties of general type.

Classification in small dimensions

The following discussion concerns smooth Fano varieties over the complex numbers.

A Fano curve is isomorphic to the projective line.

A Fano surface is also called a del Pezzo surface. Every del Pezzo surface is isomorphic to either P1 × P1 or to the projective plane blown up in at most 8 points, which must be in general position. As a result, they are all rational.

In dimension 3, there are smooth complex Fano varieties which are not rational, for example cubic 3-folds in P4 (by Clemens - Griffiths) and quartic 3-folds in P4 (by Iskovskikh - Manin).  classified the smooth Fano 3-folds with second Betti number 1 into 17 classes, and   classified the smooth ones with second Betti number at least 2, finding 88 deformation classes.

See also
 Periodic table of shapes a project to classify all Fano varieties in three, four and five dimensions.

Notes

External links 

 Fanography - A tool to visually study the classification of threedimensional Fano varieties.

References
 
 
 
 
 

 
 
 
 
 

Algebraic geometry
3-folds